Hindmarsh Square/Mukata (formerly Mogata) is one of five public squares in the Adelaide city centre, South Australia. It is located in the centre of the north-eastern quarter of the city, and surrounds the intersection of Grenfell and Pulteney Streets, near the eastern end of the Rundle Mall. Pirie Street forms the southern boundary of the square.

It is one of six squares designed by the founder of Adelaide, Colonel William Light, who was Surveyor-General at the time, in his 1837 plan of the City of Adelaide which spanned the River Torrens Valley, comprising the city centre (South Adelaide) and North Adelaide. It was named after John Hindmarsh, the first Governor of South Australia, in the same year by the Street Naming Committee. In 2003, as part of the Adelaide City Council's dual naming initiative, it was assigned a second name, Mogata (later corrected to Mukata), in the Kaurna language of the original inhabitants.

The north-western quadrant of the square is also known as "Emo Park".

History

Hindmarsh Square was included by Colonel Light on his 1836 survey "Plan of Adelaide". It was first named by the street naming committee on 23 May 1837 after Governor Hindmarsh. The east side of the square was for many years dominated by the Congregational Church, which later became the orchestral studio for ABC Radio and the South Australian Symphony Orchestra at No. 44, with other studios in adjacent buildings (48–56) and a rehearsal studio and recording facilities across the square in the ground floor and basement of Football House (No. 55).

The building then named CitiCentre, on the north-western side of the square, was the scene of the high-profile murder of psychiatrist Margaret Tobin in 2002.

In March 2003, as part of the City of Adelaide's dual naming project in association with the University of Adelaide's project, the square was assigned the name "Mogata", from the Kaurna word Mukarta, meaning "head". The spelling was later changed to Mukata. This was the name of one of the four wives of Mullawirraburka, a Kaurna elder and warrior, also known as "King John". Mukata was also known as "Pretty Mary".

In 2018, two charging stations for electric vehicles were created in Hindmarsh Square, as part of a citywide plan which created a total of 46 EV stations across the city centre.

Description
The square consists of four quadrants, being transected by Pulteney and Grenfell Streets.

The north-eastern quadrant is known as Hindmarsh Square Playspace, also known as "Emo Park", owing to the number of young people who identify with the emo subculture who gather there. This part contains four sculptures of oversized objects, namely, tap, hose, thong, and fish bones, designed by artists Ryan Sims and Gerry Wedd, who collaborated with landscape architects Taylor Cullity Lethlean to create a playground around the sculptures.

The north-western quadrant started attracting some overflow from Emo Park in 2022. It is bordered by the Pullman Adelaide Hotel in the corner, and the Griffins Head pub on Grenfell Street.

Heritage buildings

The Griffins

The Griffins Hotel, formerly (before its 2012 renovation) called the Griffin's Head  or Griffins Head Hotel, was listed as a local heritage place of significance to the City of Adelaide on 1 November 2001. Located at 36–40 Hindmarsh Square, it is on the north-eastern corner with Grenfell Street.

There had been previous hotels existing on the site since 1850, with the current hotel being rebuilt in 1886 for Arthur Waterhouse, son of wealthy Adelaide entrepreneur Thomas Greaves Waterhouse, who had returned to England and died two months before the plans for the King William Hotel were approved. The building was designed by architects English and Soward, who also designed Beehive Corner, among other buildings in Adelaide. The building was named the General Gordon Hotel from when it was opened until 1928.

In 1896 the ownership of the hotel was transferred to  Arthur, Charles and Thomas Ware of the Torrenside Brewery at Hindmarsh, who sold it in 1898 to the Walkerville Co-operative Brewery Company. In 1911, a new wide verandah was added, shortly before the city council ruled to keep all verandahs to under .

Renamed the General Gordon in 1928, it underwent three further name changes before being named the Griffins Head in 1988. The interior has been renovated several times since the 1970s, with a significant fitout and renaming as The Griffin in 2012.

See also
Hurtle Square/Tangkaira
Light Square/Wauwi
Victoria Square/Tarntanyangga
Whitmore Square/Iparrityi

References

Further reading

Squares in Adelaide
Parks in Adelaide